Moniatis is a village in the Limassol District of Cyprus, located 5 km southeast of Pano Platres. The villagers claim that it was named after its numerous "mantres" (sheepfold). Its 100 to 110-strong Turkish Cypriot population was displaced as a result of the intercommunal violence in 1963, during which they fled the village to Limassol, and the Turkish invasion of Cyprus in 1974, after which they were transferred to the north.

History 
During the Kingdom of Cyprus, the chronicler Florio Bustron writes that King James II after 1464 granted Moniatis as a fief to Juan Perez Fabriges, together with other villages, among them Knodara, Koka, St Andronikos of Akaki, Mallia, Karpasso, Anglisidhes and Selino.

Climate

References

Communities in Limassol District